The 1902 Baltimore Orioles season finished with the Orioles in 8th place in the American League (AL) with a record of 50–88.  The team was managed by John McGraw and Wilbert Robinson. The team played at Oriole Park in Baltimore, Maryland.

During the season, Andrew Freedman, principal owner of the National League's (NL) New York Giants, with the financial backing of John T. Brush, principal owner of the NL's Cincinnati Reds, purchased the Orioles from John Mahon, who was deeply in debt. They raided the Orioles roster, releasing several of Baltimore's better players so that they could sign them to the Giants and Reds. AL president Ban Johnson seized control of the Orioles the next day and restocked their roster with players received on loan from other AL teams.

The Orioles' second season in Baltimore would ultimately prove to be their last, as after the season the team was replaced by the New York Highlanders, now known as the New York Yankees.

Season

Offseason 

Knowing that placing a franchise in New York City was key to the success of the American League (AL), AL president Ban Johnson secretly met with principal owner John Mahon and player-manager John McGraw, who was also a part-owner, before the season about relocating to New York. However, the transfer did not occur when they could not find a suitable venue for the team.

In March, Mike Donlin went on a drinking binge in Baltimore, during which he was arrested for urinating in public and assaulting two chorus girls. The Orioles released Donlin when he was sentenced to six months in prison.

Notable players jumped to the Orioles from the rival National League (NL). In December 1901, Joe Kelley jumped from the Brooklyn Superbas. Later in the offseason, Jimmy Sheckard also jumped from Brooklyn. Kip Selbach and Jim Jackson jumped from the New York Giants, Ernie Courtney jumped from the Boston Beaneaters, Tom Hughes jumped from the Chicago Orphans, and Dan McGann jumped from the St. Louis Cardinals. The Orioles signed Bill Keister as a free agent. With these transactions, the Orioles were seen as a contender in the AL pennant going into the 1902 season.

Regular season 
The Orioles drew over 10,000 fans on Opening Day. Three players returned to the NL in April 1902. Jack Dunn and Steve Brodie jumped to the Giants in April. Sheckard changed his mind about playing for the Orioles after four games, returning to Brooklyn.

Johnson openly feuded with McGraw. Many Orioles found themselves suspended by Johnson by midseason, including McGraw and Kelley. In early July, McGraw resigned from the team and signed with the New York Giants of the NL. At this point, the Orioles had a 26–31 record. Kelley and Wilbert Robinson succeeded McGraw as player-managers.

The franchise began to fall into significant debt by July. Kelley, son-in-law of part-owner John Mahon, reported that the team owed as much as $12,000 ($ in current dollar terms). Unable to afford that debt, Mahon purchased shares of the team from Kelley and McGraw. With this, Mahon became the majority shareholder, owning 201 of the team's 400 shares. On July 17, 1902, Mahon sold his interest in the Orioles to Andrew Freedman, principal owner of the Giants, and John T. Brush, principal owner of the Cincinnati Reds, also of the NL. The transaction was reported to have been in the range of $20,000 ($ in current dollar terms). That day, Freedman and Brush released Kelley, Joe McGinnity, Roger Bresnahan, Jack Cronin, Cy Seymour, and Dan McGann from their Oriole contracts. Brush then signed Kelley and Seymour to the Reds, while Freedman signed McGinnity, Bresnahan, Cronin, and McGann, joining McGraw, his new player-manager, on the Giants.

Though Kip Selbach and Jimmy Williams were both pressed to agree to relocate as well, they refused to leave Baltimore, saying they would honor their two-year contracts. McGinnity allegedly attempted to contact Johnson that night, offering to stay with the Orioles if he could receive Johnson's personal assurance that he was welcome to stay. McGinnity did not hear back from Johnson, who had left his phone off the hook that night to avoid being contacted, and joined his teammates with the Giants. On that day, the Orioles were forced to forfeit their game against the St. Louis Browns, as Baltimore lacked the minimum number of players required to compete.

Johnson used a league rule to join the Orioles' minority owners to seize control of the team.  Now running the Orioles, Johnson sought to restock the team. He requested players from the other AL franchises to fill the Orioles' roster. Sport McAllister was loaned to the Orioles from the Detroit Tigers for three games, but the Tigers requested McAllister back, as the Orioles came to Detroit to play the Tigers. The Orioles received Pop Dillon from the Tigers, but released him after using him in two games. Snake Wiltse was sent to the Orioles from the Philadelphia Athletics on July 19, but he struggled for the Orioles. The Orioles also received Lew Drill on loan from the Washington Senators, sold Charlie Shields to the St. Louis Browns and purchased Jack Thoney from the Cleveland Bronchos.

Season results 
The Orioles finished the season with a 50–88 record, good for last place in the AL. For their final game at Oriole Park, the team drew only 138 fans. During the owners meetings in late 1902, the franchise was transferred to New York. MLB would not return to Baltimore until the former Browns moved to Baltimore in 1954.

Season standings

Record vs. opponents

Roster

Player stats

Batting

Starters by position 
Note: Pos = Position; G = Games played; AB = At bats; H = Hits; Avg. = Batting average; HR = Home runs; RBI = Runs batted in

Other batters 
Note: G = Games played; AB = At bats; H = Hits; Avg. = Batting average; HR = Home runs; RBI = Runs batted in

Pitching

Starting pitchers 
Note: G = Games pitched; IP = Innings pitched; W = Wins; L = Losses; ERA = Earned run average; SO = Strikeouts

Other pitchers 
Note: G = Games pitched; IP = Innings pitched; W = Wins; L = Losses; ERA = Earned run average; SO = Strikeouts

References

External links 
1902 Baltimore Orioles team page at Baseball Reference
Baltimore Orioles team page at www.baseball-almanac.com

Baltimore Orioles season
1902 in sports in Maryland